The Indianapolis Traction Terminal was a major interurban train station in downtown Indianapolis, Indiana. It was the largest interurban station in the world and at its peak handled 500 trains per day and seven million passengers per year. The station opened in 1904 and remained in use until 1941, when interurban operation ended. It continued to serve as a bus station until 1968 and was demolished in 1972. The Hilton Indianapolis now stands at its location.

Design 

The terminal was designed by D. H. Burnham & Company, an architectural firm based in Chicago. The terminal consisted of three parts: a nine-story office building, a passenger waiting platform, and an adjoining train shed.

It was positioned north-south, with trains entering from Market Street and exiting to Ohio Street. The train shed severed Wabash Street.

East of the train shed was the waiting station.

The building's frame was constructed with steel. The exterior of the first two stories was covered in Bedford limestone, native to Indiana, while the remaining seven stories were "speckled brick."

The original complex included a freight-handling area in the northwest corner. By 1918 freight traffic outstripped the terminal's ability to handle it and the Terre Haute, Indianapolis and Eastern Traction Company constructed a separate freight station on Kentucky Avenue. All freight traffic to the terminal ended in 1924.

History 

The terminal was the joint effort of seven interurban railroads which provided service to Indianapolis: Indiana Traction; Indianapolis and Eastern Railway; Indianapolis and Cincinnati Traction; Indianapolis, Columbus and Southern Traction; Indianapolis and Martinville Rapid Transit; Indianapolis Coal Traction; and the Indianapolis and Northwestern Traction. Construction began in July 1903 and was completed in September 1904. The total cost of construction exceeded . It was the largest interurban station in the world.

Indianapolis stood at the center of a large interurban network; in 1914 the terminal handled 500 trains per day and seven million passengers per year. Interurban service to the terminal ended in 1941 as the industry collapsed. The tracks were paved over but the terminal remained in use as a bus station until October 1968, at which time the former train shed was removed. In April 1972 the office building was demolished as well. The Hilton Indianapolis, originally constructed as the headquarters of Blue Cross Blue Shield of Indiana (part of Anthem), now occupies the block.

When the Terminal's train shed was torn down in 1968, it was dismantled, not demolished. The structural steel girder sections were numbered and removed to the site of the Indiana Museum of Transport and Communication (known today as the Indiana Transportation Museum) in Forest Park, located in Noblesville, Indiana. The $10,500 cost for that portion of the project was almost entirely financed (all but $500) by a donation from Ruth Lilly, and the original goal was to eventually reassemble the shed and use it to shelter the museum's existing and future railroad equipment collection. An adjoining two-story office and waiting room was envisioned, which was to include a scaled-down replica of the terminal's original waiting room. However, the plan languished due to the prohibitive projected cost of its reconstruction. The stacked girders remained untouched until the early 1980s, when they were finally hauled away as scrap.

The only surviving remnants of the complex today are two stone eagle sculptures that once flanked either side of the train shed. They were removed in 1968 and are now located on the steps of the Old Indianapolis City Hall.

References

External links 

 Indianapolis Traction Terminal at Historic Indianapolis

1904 establishments in Indiana
Buildings and structures in Indianapolis
Former railway stations in Indiana
Railway stations closed in 1941
Railway stations in the United States opened in 1904
Transportation buildings and structures in Marion County, Indiana
1972 disestablishments in Indiana
Buildings and structures demolished in 1972
Demolished railway stations in the United States